The 2006–07 WHL season was the 41st season for the Western Hockey League. Twenty-one teams completed a 72-game season. The Everett Silvertips won the Scotty Munro Memorial Trophy, after having the best record in the WHL during the regular season. The Medicine Hat Tigers won the President's Cup, defeating the Vancouver Giants in seven games.  The Giants captured the 2007 Memorial Cup as tournament hosts, defeating the Tigers in the championship game.

League notes
 The Chilliwack Bruins joined the WHL as an expansion team, playing in the B.C. Division of the Western Conference.
 The Kootenay Ice returned to the Central Division of the Eastern Conference.
 The Swift Current Broncos moved to the East Division of the Eastern Conference.
 On October 23, three players with the Moose Jaw Warriors were struck by a suspected drunk driver while returning home following a road trip.  Two players were treated and released from a Moose Jaw hospital, however Garrett Robinson was critically injured in the accident. 
 The WHL announced that the championship trophy would be renamed the Ed Chynoweth Cup in honour of Ed Chynoweth, who served as WHL president from 1972 until 1995, and two terms as Chairman of the Board following.

Final standings

Eastern Conference

Western Conference

Scoring leaders

Note: GP = Games played; G = Goals; A = Assists; Pts = Points; PIM = Penalty minutes

Goaltending leaders
Note: GP = Games played; Min = Minutes played; W = Wins; L = Losses; SOL = Shootout losses ; GA = Goals against; SO = Total shutouts; SV% = Save percentage; GAA = Goals against average

2007 WHL Playoffs

Overview

Note:For the first round, the first place team in each division plays the fourth place team; the second place team faces the third. After the first round, the four remaining teams in each conference are reseeded by regular season record.

Conference quarterfinals

Eastern Conference

Western Conference

Conference semifinals

Conference finals

WHL Championship

Memorial Cup

The Vancouver Giants hosted the 2007 Memorial Cup tournament, which also featured the WHL champion Medicine Hat Tigers.  The Plymouth Whalers represented the Ontario Hockey League, and the Lewiston Maineiacs represented the Quebec Major Junior Hockey League.

The Tigers earned a spot in the Championship game with a 2–1 round robin record, falling 3–1 to the Maineiacs before defeating the Whalers 4–1, and the Giants 1–0.

The Giants also finished 2–1, defeating Plymouth 4–3 in Overtime and Lewiston 2–1. Their loss to Medicine Hat dropped them into a semi-final game.

The Giants prevailed in the semi-final to meet the Tigers in the Cup Final, and defeated Medicine Hat 3–1 to take the title.

2006 ADT Canada-Russia Challenge

On November 29, the WHL defeated the Russian Selects 5–3 before a crowd of 4,404 at Chilliwack, British Columbia.

On November 30, the WHL defeated the Russian Selects 8–1 before a crowd of 4,136 at Kamloops, British Columbia.

All time, the WHL has an 8–0 lead in the series which began in 2003.

WHL awards

All-Star Teams

source: Western Hockey League press release

2007 Bantam draft
The 2007 WHL Bantam Draft was the 18th Bantam Draft. It was hosted by the Stampede Park Round-Up Centre on Thursday May 3, 2007, via the internet.

List of first round picks in the bantam draft.

See also
2006–07 OHL season
2006–07 QMJHL season
2007 Memorial Cup
2007 NHL Entry Draft
2006 in ice hockey
2007 in ice hockey

References
whl.ca

WHL
Western Hockey League seasons
WHL